Hashmatullah Khan Retired Deputy Inspector General (DIG) in Gilgit-Baltistan Police . He belongs to Bunji, Pakistan in Astore District,  Gilgit-Baltistan. He is Pakistani politician Central Deputy Secretary General PTI Pakistan
Member CEC PTI Pakistan
Former President PTI GB who is currently serving as a member of the Gilgit-Baltistan Council since 12 November 2021. He belongs to Pakistan Tehreek-e-Insaf (PTI) Since 2012 .

References

Living people
Pakistan Tehreek-e-Insaf politicians
Members of the Gilgit-Baltistan Council
Year of birth missing (living people)
People from Gilgit District